Yeo Jin-goo (born August 13, 1997) is a South Korean actor. Yeo began his career as a child actor, debuting in the film Sad Movie (2005). Nicknamed "Nation's Little Brother", he went on to play the younger characters of the lead roles in movies and television dramas such as in A Frozen Flower (2008), Giant (2010), Moon Embracing the Sun (2012), and Missing You (2012). He is known for playing the title character in the action thriller Hwayi: A Monster Boy (2013), for which he won Best New Actor at the Blue Dragon Film Awards.

Since then, he has taken on lead roles in the films Shoot Me in the Heart (2015), The Long Way Home (2015), and Warriors of the Dawn (2017). He has also starred in the dramas Orange Marmalade (2015), The Royal Gambler (2016), Circle (2017), Reunited Worlds (2017), The Crowned Clown (2019), My Absolute Boyfriend (2019), Hotel del Luna (2019), Beyond Evil (2021), and Link: Eat, Love, Kill (2022).

Early life and education 
Yeo was born on August 13, 1997. He is the eldest of two siblings and has a younger brother. As a child, Yeo wanted to appear on television and therefore asked his parents to let him try acting. With the support of his parents, he took acting lessons and eventually made his debut on the big-screen with Sad Movie (2005).

He graduated from Namgang High School, an all boys high school, in 2016. He is currently studying at Chung-Ang University, majoring in the Department of Theater.

Career

2005–2011: Beginnings as a child actor 
In 2005, Yeo made his debut at the age of eight in the film Sad Movie. He auditioned for the role of Park Hwi-chan and was chosen among 150 candidates despite having no previous acting experience. In 2006, he appeared in his first television drama I Want to Love, playing a sickly child of a single mother; followed by his first role in a sageuk drama Yeon Gaesomun as young Kim Heum-soon.

In 2008, he played the younger version of the lead roles in the series Iljimae and Tazza. He won his first acting award as Best Child Actor at the SBS Drama Awards for both dramas.

In 2010, he starred in the drama Giant as the younger counterpart to Lee Beom-soo's character. According to Yeo, this was the first time he fully immersed himself in a role and began taking acting seriously.

In 2011, he played the younger part of the title character in the historical drama Warrior Baek Dong-soo. He also made a brief appearance as teenage Ddol-bok in the drama Deep Rooted Tree. The appearance was upon the request of its lead actor Jang Hyuk, who took a liking to Yeo when the latter portrayed his younger version in the drama Tazza.

2012: Rising popularity 
In 2012, Yeo rose to prominence when he starred in the fantasy-period drama Moon Embracing the Sun, playing the role of a young crown prince. The drama surpassed 40% in ratings and gained "national drama" status. This was followed by a well-received turn in melodrama Missing You.  He won Best Young Actor at the 2012 MBC Drama Awards for his portrayal in both dramas.

2013–present: Transition to lead roles 
In 2013, Yeo starred as the titular character in action thriller Hwayi: A Monster Boy, for which he garnered praises and won several Best New Actor honors from annual award ceremonies such as Blue Dragon Film Awards and Korean Association of Film Critics Awards. He is the youngest male actor to receive the Best New Actor award in the history of Blue Dragon Film Awards, at the age of sixteen. In the same year, he was also cast in the sitcom, Potato Star 2013QR3 as an aspiring mobile application developer.

In 2015, he starred in the film Shoot Me in the Heart, based on the bestselling novel of the same name by Jeong Yu-jeong. He had his first leading role on television with teen vampire series, Orange Marmalade, based on the webtoon of the same name. He won Best New Actor Award at 2015 KBS Drama Awards for his role. In the same year, he appeared in the Korean War film, The Long Way Home. Veteran actor Sol Kyung-gu, his co-star in the film, strongly recommended Yeo for the role of Yeong-gwang, and only signed the movie contract once Yeo's casting had been finalized.

In 2016, Yeo played the role of King Yeongjo in the SBS drama The Royal Gambler, and won an Excellence Award at the year end SBS Drama Awards.

In 2017, Yeo starred in tvN's science fiction drama Circle, and historical movie Warriors of the Dawn, both of which premiered in May. He was also cast for a special appearance in the star-studded film, 1987: When the Day Comes, based on the June Democratic Uprising. The movie reunited him with Director Jang Joon-hwan and actor Kim Yoon-seok of Hwayi: A Monster Boy. In July, he starred in SBS's romance drama Reunited Worlds.

In 2018, Yeo was cast in the romantic comedy My Absolute Boyfriend, based on the Japanese manga series of the same name. It aired on SBS the following year.

In 2019, he starred in tvN's remake of the 2012 Korean film Masquerade, titled The Crowned Clown, playing dual roles as clown Ha-seon and King Yi Heon for which he received the nomination for the Best Actor - Television at 55th Baeksang Arts Awards. The same year, he was cast in Hong sisters' fantasy mystery drama Hotel del Luna alongside IU. The drama was a commercial success, recording the highest ratings in its timeslot throughout its run.

In 2020, Yeo made a special voice appearance in the drama Start Up as Jang Young Shil, the AI speaker. He also made a live action cameo in the final episode as a start-up owner named Hong Ji Seok.

In 2021, Yeo starred in the psychological thriller drama Beyond Evil alongside Shin Ha-kyun as the main leads which premiered in February and aired on JTBC. Shin Ha-kyun and Yeo previously appeared in the film No Mercy for the Rude (2006) where Yeo played the younger version of Shin's character. And in June 2021, Yeo was confirmed as an MC for Girls Planet 999 which aired on Mnet in August. 

In 2022, Yeo starred in the tvN fantasy-melodrama Link: Eat, Love, Kill as a sous chef at a high-end restaurant. Later that year, Yeo made his return to the big screen after five years with Ditto, a remake of the  2000 film of the same name.

Filmography

Ambassadorship

Awards and nominations

References

External links

 Yeo Jin-goo at Janus Entertainment 
 
 

South Korean male musical theatre actors
South Korean male film actors
South Korean male television actors
South Korean male child actors
South Korean television personalities
1997 births
Place of birth missing (living people)
Living people
21st-century South Korean male actors
South Korean Buddhists
Male actors from Seoul
Hamyang Yeo clan